Luciano Thomas van den Berg (22 June 1984 – 18 September 2005) was a Dutch football defender.

Club career
He made his debut for Stormvogels Telstar as a substitute against VVV Venlo in the 2004/2005 Eerste Divisie playoffs, immediately scoring the winning goal. He started his first match against FC Zwolle the next season, on the day before he lost his life in a car accident.

Death
Van den Berg died in September 2005 when he lost control of his car, drove through a roadblock and crashed. A close friend of Nigel de Jong, he was aged 21. The club retired his number 22 in his honour.

References

1984 births
2005 deaths
Footballers from Amsterdam
Association football defenders
Dutch footballers
SC Telstar players
Eerste Divisie players
Road incident deaths in the Netherlands